Ysanne Churchman  (born 14 May 1925) is an English actress. She worked as an actress and narrator on British radio, TV and film for over 50 years (1938–1993). She gained attention as Grace Archer in the long-running BBC radio drama series The Archers, when Grace died after a fire on the night when ITV launched in 1955.

Ysanne Churchman was born in Sutton Coldfield, Warwickshire, to Andrew Churchman and Gladys Dale, stage and radio performers in London.

In 1938, Churchman appeared on both BBC Radio Children's Hour and in a BBC Television play, Gallows Glorious. She trained as a dancer at Cone-Ripman College. After learning repertory and theatre, she specialised in radio and voice work for film and television. She played Grace in the long-running radio series The Archers when Grace suffered grievous injuries in a fire on the night of the ITV launch in 1955; the character died in the following day's episode. She strongly suspected the producer was glad to be rid of her at the time as she had discovered that some of her cast members in this regional, Birmingham, production, were not being paid Equity minimum rates and raised the matter. She voiced five other Archers characters over the years, the last being Mary Pound in 1983.

Along with many story-telling and reading roles on the BBC, she also performed as: Sara in the series Sara and Hoppity, Marla and Cassie in Space Patrol, the voice of Alpha Centauri in the series Doctor Who, and Soo the computer in The Flipside of Dominick Hide and its sequel. She was the first actress employed by Capital Radio, reading a serial book.

She married Tony Pilgrim MBE, a senior BBC engineer, in 1951; they celebrated their Diamond Wedding anniversary in 2011. He died in January 2015 after 63 years of marriage. She retired in 1993, but still does occasional voice-over and television appearances, most recently reprising her role as the voice of Delegate Alpha Centauri in the Doctor Who story "Empress of Mars", shown on BBC One on 10 June 2017, having last voiced the character in 1974.

Selected credits
Children's Hour, BBC Radio, 1938
Gallows Glorious, BBC TV, 1938
Red for Danger, BBC Radio, 1954
The Archers, BBC Radio, 1951–1985 – Jennifer Archer, Grace Archer, Barbara Drury, Joan Ilverton, Jocelyn Page, Mary Pound.
The Railway Children, BBC TV, 1957 – Ruth
Sense and Sensibility, BBC Home Service (Radio 4), 1959/60 – Marianne Dashwood
Sara and Hoppity, ITV, 1960, – Sara & other voices
Space Patrol, ITV, 1963, – Marla & Cassiopeia 
Sherlock Holmes, BBC Radio, 1969 – Mary Sutherland
Crossroads, ITV 1960s/1970s – four different appearances
Doctor Who, 1972, The Curse of Peladon – Voice of Alpha Centauri
Doctor Who, 1974, The Monster of Peladon – Voice of Alpha Centauri
Doctor Who, 1974, Planet of the Spiders – Spider voices
The Twelve Tasks of Asterix, 1976 – Voice Artist, English version
Beasts, ITV 1976, "Special Offer" – Joyce
Softly, Softly, BBC 1970s – four appearances
Shoestring, 1979, "Knock For Knock" – Woman's voice
A Dance to the Music of Time, 1979 – Milly
We, the Accused, TV, 1980 –  Edith Hanks
The Flipside of Dominick Hide, 1980 – Soo (computer)
Another Flip for Dominick, 1982 – Soo (house computer)
 Ghost in the Water, 1982, – Mrs. Parkes
Amy, TV, 1984 – Lilly
Starlings, TV, 1988 – Mrs Grimshaw
Pyramid, documentary, 1988 – Voice artist
Prostitute, 1991 – Magistrate
Lipstick on Your Collar, TV, 1993 – Mrs Atterbow
Oliver Twist, TV, 1999 – Woman in street
Doctor Who, 2017, "Empress of Mars" – Voice of Alpha Centauri

References

External links

1925 births
Living people
English film actresses
English stage actresses
English television actresses
English radio actresses
English voice actresses
People from Sutton Coldfield
The Archers
20th-century English actresses
21st-century English actresses
Actresses from Warwickshire